Mason is an occupational surname of Scottish and English origin, with variations also found in Italian and French, generally referring to someone who performed stonemasonry work.

People with the surname

A
Abbie K. Mason (1861–1908) was a Black American suffragist
A. E. W. Mason (1865–1948), English author
Alex Mason, the protagonist of the 2010 video game Call of Duty: Black Ops
Allan Mason (1921–2006),  English first-class cricketer
Allan Mason, American record producer and A&R executive
Andrea Mason (politician) (born 1968), Australian politician
Angela Mason (born 1944), British activist
Anthony Mason (disambiguation), multiple people
Armistead Thomson Mason (1787–1819), US Senator

B
Babbie Mason (born 1955), American gospel singer
Barbara Mason (born 1947), American singer
Barry Mason (1935–2021), British songwriter
Ben Mason (disambiguation), multiple people
Benjamin Mason (disambiguation), multiple people
Benedict Mason (born 1954), British composer
Bertha Mason, fictional character from the novel Jane Eyre
Bertha Mason (suffragist) (1855–1939), English suffragist
Biddy Mason (1818–1891), American freed slave, nurse and businesswoman
Bill Mason (1929–1988), Canadian canoeist, author, artist
Bobbie Ann Mason (born 1940), American novelist
Bobby Joe Mason (1936–2006), American basketball player
Brett Mason (born 1962), Australian politician
Brewster Mason (1922–1987), British actor
Brian Mason (born 1953), Canadian politician

C
Caroline Atherton Mason (née Briggs) (1823–1890), American poet
Catherine Mason, Australian-born British-based digital art historian
Cathy Mason, Northern Irish politician
Charles Mason (1728–1786), British astronomer
Charles Harrison Mason (1866–1961), American religious leader
Chris Mason (born 1976), Canadian ice hockey player
Chris Mason (born 1969), British darts player
Clarence Mason (born 1965), American lawyer and professional wrestling manager
Colin Mason (1926–2020), Australian author, journalist and politician
Concetta Mason (born 1952), American glass artist
Connie Mason (born 1937), American model

D
Daniel Mason (born ca. 1976), American novelist and physician
David Mason (disambiguation), multiple people
Derrick Mason (born 1974), American football player
Desmond Mason (born 1977), American basketball player
Dutch Mason (1938–2006), Canadian musician

E
Edith Mason (1892–1973), American singer
Edward J. Mason (1912–1971), British radio writer
Edward J. Mason (politician) (1930–2020), Maryland state senator
Edwyn E. Mason (1913–2003), New York politician
Emma Mason (born 1986), Scottish badminton player

F
F. Van Wyck Mason (1901–1978), American historian and novelist
Frank Mason (disambiguation), multiple people

G
Garrett Mason (born 1985), American politician
Gary Mason (disambiguation), multiple people
Germaine Mason (1983–2017), Jamaican athlete
George Mason (disambiguation), multiple people
Gilbert R. Mason (1928–2006), American physician and civil rights leader
Gina Mason (1959–2017), American politician
Glen Mason (born 1950), American football coach
Glyn Mason, 2nd Baron Blackford (1887–1972), British politician
Grace-Evangeline Mason (born 1994), British composer

H
Harry Mason (disambiguation), multiple people
Harvey Mason (born 1947), American drummer
Helen Mason (1938–1989), British journalist and author
Henry Mason (disambiguation), multiple people
Herbert Mason (1891–1960), British movie director, movie producer, and stage actor
Herbert Louis Mason (1896–1994), American botanist and herbarium director
Hilda Mason (1916–2007), American politician
Hilda Mason (architect) (1879–1955), English architect
Hugh Mason (1817–1886) English mill owner, social reformer and politician
Hugh Mason (1915–2010)

I
Ian J. Mason (late 20th c.), Australian ornithologist and taxonomist

J
Jack Mason (1874–1958), English cricketer
Jack Mason (1896–1968), British World War I flying ace
Jackie Mason (1928–2021), American comedian
James Mason (disambiguation), multiple people
James Wood-Mason (1846–1893), English zoologist
Jeanine Mason (born 1991), American actress and dancer
John Mason (disambiguation), multiple people
Johanna Mason, character in The Hunger Games trilogy series.
Jonathan Mason (disambiguation), multiple people
Jordan Mason (born 1999), American football player
Joseph Mason (disambiguation), multiple people
 Sir Josiah Mason (1795–1881), pen manufacturer

K
Kendra Mason, a fictional character in Degrassi: The Next Generation
Kevin Mason (born 1972), American football player

L
Laura Mason (1957-2021), British food historian
Len Mason (1903–1953), New Zealand rugby player
Leonard F. Mason (1920–1944), American Marine
Lisa Mason (born 1982), British gymnast
Lowell Mason (1792–1872), American composer
Lowell B. Mason (1893–1983), chair of the Federal Trade Commission

M
Margery Mason (1913–2014) English actress and director
Marius Mason (born 1962), American environmental activist and anarchist
Martin Mason (disambiguation), multiple people
Marsha Mason, (born 1942), American actress
Matthew Mason (disambiguation), multiple people
Max Mason (1877–1961), American mathematician
Melvin T. Mason, American politician
Michael Mason (disambiguation), multiple people
Monica Mason (born 1941), British ballet dancer
Moose Mason, fictional character in Archie Comics
Morgan Mason (born 1955), American politician, film producer, and actor

N
Newton E. Mason (1850–1945), United States Navy rear admiral
Newton Henry Mason (1918–1942), United States Navy fighter pilot
Nick Mason (born 1944), British drummer for Pink Floyd
Noel Mason-MacFarlane (1889–1953), British soldier and politician

O
Otis Tufton Mason (1838–1908), American anthropologist

P
Pat Mason, American college baseball coach
Paul Jonathan Mason former heavyweight man
Perry Mason, fictional lawyer of Erle Stanley Gardner

R
R. A. K. Mason (1905–1971), New Zealand poet
Raymond Mason (disambiguation), multiple people
Richard Mason (disambiguation), multiple people
Robert Mason (disambiguation), multiple people
Roger Mason Jr. (born 1980), American basketball player
Ron Mason (1940–2016), Canadian ice hockey coach
Ron G. Mason (1916–2005), British oceanographer
Ronald Mason Jr., American academic administrator
Roswell B. Mason (1805–1892), mayor of Chicago
Roy Mason (1924–2015), British politician
Roy Mason (1938–1996), American architect
Ryan Mason (born 1991), English footballer and manager

S
Samuel Jefferson Mason (1921–1974), American electrical engineer
Sandra Mason, 1st President of Barbados
Sarah Mason (disambiguation), multiple people
Scott Mason (disambiguation), multiple people
Sidney Mason, Amerocan actor
Sidney Redding Mason, American businessman and politician
Simon Mason (born 1973), English field hockey goalkeeper
Skookum Jim Mason (c. 1859 – 1916), also known as Keish, Canadian prospector
Spinner Mason, a fictional character in Degrassi: The Next Generation 
Stella Mason (?–1918), Muscogee/Creek freedman, she was subject to a known lawsuit. 
Steve Mason (disambiguation), multiple people
Stevens Thomson Mason (senator) (1760–1803), American politician
Stevens T. Mason (1811–1843), American politician
Sylvia Mason-James (born 1958), British singer

T
Theodorus B. M. Mason (1848–1899), American naval intelligence officer
Thomas Henry Mason (1811–1900), British Admiral
Timothy Mason (1940–1990), British Marxist historian
Timothy Mason (born 1950), American playwright
Tom Mason (actor, born 1920) (1920–1980), American chiropractor
Tom Mason (actor, born 1949), American actor
Tony Mason, British rally co-driver

V
C. Vernon Mason, American lawyer, known for involvement in Tawana Brawley incident.

W
Warren P. Mason (1900–1986), electrical engineer and scientist
William Mason (disambiguation), multiple people

See also
Major Matt Mason, action figure
Masson (surname)
Sheku Kanneh-Mason

References

English-language surnames
Italian-language surnames
Surnames of English origin
Occupational surnames
English-language occupational surnames